The Bahamas was represented at the 1958 British Empire and Commonwealth Games in Cardiff by one competitor, Tom Robinson, who won gold in the 200 yards dash and silver in the 100 yards dash.

Nations at the 1958 British Empire and Commonwealth Games
1958
British Empire and Commonwealth Games